Jeyhun Dasht Rural District is a rural district (dehestan) in Shara District, Hamadan County, Hamadan Province, Iran. At the 2006 census, its population was 8,719, in 1,946 families. The rural district has 15 villages.

References 

Rural Districts of Hamadan Province
Hamadan County